Cal Kestis is a fictional character in the Star Wars franchise. He is the player character and main protagonist of the 2019 video game Star Wars Jedi: Fallen Order, an action-adventure game developed by Respawn Entertainment, and its upcoming sequel, Star Wars Jedi: Survivor (in 2023). Within the series, Cal is a former Jedi Padawan who survived the Great Jedi Purge and went into hiding. Years later, he is detected using the Force and is then led on a journey to rebuild the Jedi Order. He is portrayed through performance capture by American actor and model Cameron Monaghan. 

Cal also appeared in a brief cameo in the novel Star Wars: Brotherhood by Mike Chen and will appear as the main character in the upcoming novel Star Wars Jedi: Battle Scars by Sam Maggs.

Cal has received a generally positive reception from critics.

Development and design 
Monaghan provides both the voice and likeness for Cal's character, including his natural red hair. On playing the part of Cal, he said "It's pretty surreal to see a character that you built and got to explore and imagine. It's a character that I've really grown to love." He also stated, "It's such a privilege to be able to play something that has a storied history behind it, but also something that I'm a fan of and have always wanted to be part of since I was a kid." The actor "didn't want to model Cal on any specific Star Wars character", adding "I wanted Cal's personality and demeanor and everything to come out of his own experiences and his own stories, and to build it from an inward place."

During his audition process for the game, Monaghan wasn't told that he was auditioning for a Star Wars game. "At that point I didn't know I was auditioning for a Star Wars game, but I kinda knew. They made these fake audition pages and stuff, and I was kinda reading it like 'hmmm ... This is Star Wars, isn't it?' They were like 'No, of course not.' So when I got into the room and they gave me the toy lightsaber, I was like 'I knew it!

Before the developers knew who Cal Kestis was going to be, there were several different concepts. The director of the game, Stig Asmussen revealed "We talked about doing an alien character, we talked about doing a different gender, but we arrived at where we were because at the time, Rey was kind of the thing for Star Wars, so it made a lot more sense for us to have a male protagonist."

Fictional biography

Clone Wars 
Cal Kestis was a Jedi Padawan during the Clone Wars, training under Jedi General Jaro Tapal (Travis Willingham). After a successful mission, Cal, his Master, and their troops prepared to leave for Mygeeto when Supreme Chancellor Palpatine initiated Order 66, turning all the clone troops against the Jedi, including Kestis and Tapal. Tapal, able to sense the betrayal of his troops, killed the clone preparing to shoot him. The duo made their way to the escape pods with Kestis sneaking through the pipes while Tapal sabotaged the ship's reactor. Cal made it to the escape pods with his master despite losing his lightsaber. As they entered the escape pods, Tapal was fatally shot by one of the troopers and died advising his pupil to stay true to the Jedi. Cal kept his Master's lightsaber, originally a dual-bladed lightsaber splintered in two from a shot from a clone blaster. Cal was heavily traumatized by this event, hence he could only use the Force to slow objects down due to the trauma damaging his connection to the Force.

Age of the Empire 

Five years after the Jedi Purge, Cal remains in hiding on the planet Bracca as a rigger for the Scrapper Guild. During an accident, he uses the Force to save a friend's life, though is spotted by an Imperial Probe droid. This leads the Empire to send their Inquisitors after him, led by the Second Sister. Cal is rescued by former Jedi Cere Junda and pilot Greez Dritus, who allow him to take refuge on their ship Stinger Mantis. Since the former has cut herself from the Force after a brush with the Dark Side, Cal is recruited to retrieve a Holocron containing a list of Force-sensitive people in the galaxy, which will allow them to train more Jedi and reform the Order.

Tracking it to the planet Bogano, Cal befriends a droid named BD-1 and learns the Holocron was hidden by Jedi master Eno Cordova, Cere's former master and the droid's former owner. The only way to retrieve it is to recover an artifact called the Astrium, developed by an extinct species called the Zeffo and hidden in an ancient tomb visited by the Jedi. With assistance from BD-1, Cere, and Greez, Cal retraces Cordova's steps to the planets Zeffo, Kashyyyk, and Dathomir to investigate the Zeffo's tombs. During the journey, he allies himself with Saw Gerrera's Rebels during a battle with the Empire and comes into conflict with the Haxion Brood, a crime syndicate to whom Greez owes a debt. Cal also learns that the Second Sister is actually Cere's former Padawan Trilla, who she betrayed to the Empire after being captured and interrogated by Darth Vader.

Eventually tracking the Astrium to Dathomir, Cal comes into conflict with Nightsister Merrin and fallen Jedi Taron Malicos. Whilst accessing the final tomb, he is subjected to visions of the Jedi Purge and a bitter Tapal, who blames him for his death and destroys his lightsaber. Forced to flee as Merrin and Malicos battle each other, Cal is prepared to give up the search, though Cere convinces him to continue and rebuild his Lightsaber with parts of her own. With help from BD-1, Cal recovers a Kyber Crystal from Ilum, during which he realizes that he can overcome failures and comes to terms with his guilt. After constructing his new weapon, he returns to Dathomir and joins forces with Merrin to defeat Malicos. Cal then retrieves the Astrium and invites Merrin to join the Mantis crew.

Returning to the vault, Cal uses the Astrium to access the Holocron, though experiences visions of him and the Younglings being captured and turned into future Inquisitors. He is soon attacked by Trilla, who steals the Holocron to present to Darth Vader. After being knighted by Cere, Cal helps her infiltrate the Fortress Inquisitorius to retrieve it, during which he defeats Trilla. After recovering the Holocron, they are confronted by Darth Vader, who kills Trilla for failing him and chases them through the base. Cal and Cere barely manage to escape the Sith Lord and are rescued by Merrin. Afterward, Cal and the Mantis crew decide to destroy the Holocron to ensure the safety of Force-sensitives in the galaxy.

Reception 

The character of Cal Kestis received generally positive reviews, with some expressing dissatisfaction that the final design of the character was "generic" or "dorky". Elijah Beahm from The Escapist criticized the depiction of Cal's reactions to the deaths of various characters and argued that it makes him unsympathetic as a heroic protagonist. Conversely, Nick Calandra from The Escapist defended Cal Kestis, saying "Cal learning to control his emotions and work through his trauma provides an infinitely more interesting character than he would have been had he just "followed" the Jedi way without truly understanding what it means. Once Cal finally stops fighting the past, sheathes his lightsaber, and promises to honor the teachings of his former master, only then does he become knighted as a Jedi."

Alani Vargas from CheatSheet also stated that Cal Kestis is "a great choice for the main character". Some reviewers noted that while he doesn't start off strong, the good writing, interesting cast of supporting characters and the entertaining story help the player connect with Cal. 
The actor experienced bullying over his red hair, with people making mods just to change the color of Cal's hair, and spoke out against them.

IGN named Cal Kestis one of the best video game characters of 2019, with staff member Matthew Adler highlighting his growth in power as well as his "down-to-earth personality and willingness to seek change". In 2020, Cal Kestis ranked 50th place in a "Best Star Wars character of All Time" fan poll organized by IGN.

References

External links 
 
 

Action-adventure game characters
Fictional characters with extrasensory perception
Fictional genocide survivors
Fictional swordfighters in video games
Male characters in video games
Science fiction video game characters
Star Wars Jedi characters
Star Wars video game characters
Video game characters introduced in 2019
Video game characters who can move at superhuman speeds
Video game characters who have mental powers
Video game protagonists